Thiago Lima da Silva (born 22 November 1991), commonly known as Thiago Silva, is a Brazilian professional footballer who currently plays as a midfielder for Hong Kong Premier League club HKFC.

Club career

Sham Shui Po 
On 8 August 2022, Thiago joined Sham Shui Po.

HKFC 
On 17 January 2023, Thiago joined HKFC.

Career statistics

Club

Notes

References

1991 births
Living people
Brazilian footballers
Brazilian expatriate footballers
Association football midfielders
Rio Branco Esporte Clube players
Centro Sportivo Alagoano players
Espírito Santo Futebol Clube players
Associação Desportiva Itaboraí players
C.D. Monte Carlo players
Gor Mahia F.C. players
Managua F.C. players
Windsor Arch Ka I players
Yuen Long FC players
Sham Shui Po SA players
Hong Kong FC players
Hong Kong First Division League players
Hong Kong Premier League players
Brazilian expatriate sportspeople in Macau
Brazilian expatriate sportspeople in Hong Kong
Expatriate footballers in Macau
Expatriate footballers in Hong Kong
Expatriate footballers in Nicaragua
People from Maceió
Sportspeople from Alagoas